Marc Pollefeys from the ETH Zurich, Zurich, Switzerland was named Fellow of the Institute of Electrical and Electronics Engineers (IEEE) in 2012 for contributions to three-dimensional computer vision. He was named to the 2022 class of ACM Fellows, "for contributions to geometric computer vision and applications to AR/VR/MR, robotics, and autonomous vehicles".

References

External links
 ETH Zurich Bio

Fellow Members of the IEEE
Fellows of the Association for Computing Machinery
Living people
Year of birth missing (living people)
Place of birth missing (living people)
Academic staff of ETH Zurich